Bis(trimethylsilyl)mercury is a chemical reagent with the formula (CH3)3-Si-Hg-Si-(CH3)3.

Synthesis 
This compound was first synthesized by Wiberg et al. in 1963, by the reaction of trimethylsilyl bromide with sodium amalgam:

 2 Na + Hg + TMSBr → TMS2Hg + 2 NaBr

Reactions 
On prolonged heating at 100-160 °C, or when stood under light as an ethereal solution, it decomposes to hexamethyldisilane:

 TMS2Hg → (CH3)3Si-Si(CH3)3 + Hg

Reaction with hydrogen chloride gives trimethylsilane and trimethylsilyl chloride:

 TMS2Hg + HCl → TMSH + TMSCl + Hg

References

Further reading 
 

Mercury(II) compounds
Trimethylsilyl compounds